Manic Frustration is the fifth studio album by American doom metal band Trouble, released on June 16, 1992. The album marked a change in style toward a faster-paced, psychedelic sound; as opposed to the slower, doom metal style on their previous albums. It was the band's last release via the label Def American. A promotional disc was released with the songs "'Scuse Me," "The Sleeper," and "Memory's Garden" in 1992, the last song of which also had a music video. The album was reissued and remastered by Hammerheart Records in 2020.

Track listing

Personnel
Trouble
Eric Wagner – vocals
Bruce Franklin – guitars
Rick Wartell – guitars
Ron Holzner – bass
Barry Stern – drums

Additional musicians
Rick Seratte – keyboards
Ron Anderson, Gary Hoey – vocal guidance & inspiration

Production
Rick Rubin – producer with Trouble
Chris Kupper, Brendan O'Brien – engineers
Dave Sardy – mixing at Hollywood Sound, Los Angeles
Howie Weinberg – mastering at Masterdisk, New York
Kim Champagne – art direction
Trouble – front cover concept
Jean-Francois Podevin – front cover illustration
Chris Cuffaro – individual photos

References

Trouble (band) albums
1992 albums
American Recordings (record label) albums
Albums produced by Rick Rubin